Cory Provus (born July 7, 1978) is a sports television and radio broadcaster. He is the radio voice of the Minnesota Twins and calls select games on FOX. He currently works with Dan Gladden.

Early life and education
Provus grew up in Highland Park, Illinois. He graduated from Syracuse University's S. I. Newhouse School of Public Communications in 2000. Working at WAER-FM at SU campus, he did play by play and studio hosting for the Syracuse Orange sports.
While at Syracuse, he called baseball games for minor-league Auburn of the New York–Penn League.

Career
Provus began his career calling collegiate football, basketball, and baseball games for the Virginia Tech Hokies (2000-03), Georgia Tech Yellow Jackets, UAB Blazers (2006), and the Wake Forest Demon Deacons. Cory is a play-by-play announcer for a small package of Big Ten Network games and is a play-by-play announcer for college basketball on FOX.

He began his major league broadcasting career as the pregame/postgame host for radio broadcasts of the Chicago Cubs and backed up Pat Hughes. The Milwaukee Brewers then hired Provus in 2009, replacing Jim Powell who departed for a job with the Atlanta Braves, alongside Bob Uecker until 2012. Joe Block would replace him.

The Twins hired Provus to replace John Gordon who retired after the 2011 season.

Personal life
Provus lives in Minnetonka, Minnesota with his wife Dana; they have a son and daughter. Provus is Jewish. Brad Sham, Dallas Cowboys sportscaster, is his cousin.

References

External links
 Minnesota Twins Bio

1978 births
Living people
American Jews
American radio sports announcers
Chicago Cubs announcers
College baseball announcers in the United States
College basketball announcers in the United States
College football announcers
Georgia Tech Yellow Jackets baseball broadcasters
Georgia Tech Yellow Jackets men's basketball announcers
Georgia Tech Yellow Jackets football announcers
Lacrosse announcers
Major League Baseball broadcasters
Milwaukee Brewers announcers
Minnesota Twins announcers
Minor League Baseball broadcasters
People from Highland Park, Illinois
S.I. Newhouse School of Public Communications alumni
Syracuse Orange men's basketball announcers
Syracuse Orange football announcers
Virginia Tech Hokies baseball announcers
Virginia Tech Hokies men's basketball announcers
Virginia Tech Hokies football announcers